Eduardo Gauggel might refer to:

Eduardo Gauggel Rivas, Honduran lawyer and politician, father
Eduardo Gauggel Medina, Honduran lawyer and politician, son